Keisha Spencer (born 16 February 1978) is a Jamaican athlete. She competed in the women's triple jump at the 2000 Summer Olympics.

While at Louisiana State University, she won the Honda Sports Award as the nation's best female track and field competitor in 2000.

References

External links
 

1978 births
Living people
Athletes (track and field) at the 2000 Summer Olympics
Jamaican female triple jumpers
Olympic athletes of Jamaica
Place of birth missing (living people)
LSU Lady Tigers track and field athletes